The Blue Album (released 21 June 2004) is the seventh studio album from the British electronica duo Orbital. It includes their single "One Perfect Sunrise". The album was released on CD and LP formats. Orbital announced that this would be their "final" album at the time, but subsequently reunited and recorded new music from 2009 onwards.

Album 
Blue Album's title recalls the informal names of Orbital's first two, self-titled albums, known colloquially as the Green Album and the Brown Album. "You Lot" samples a speech by Christopher Eccleston from Russell T Davies' The Second Coming.

Track listing

References

External links 
 
 

2004 albums
Orbital (band) albums